These are the official results of the Men's Decathlon competition at the 1980 Summer Olympics in Moscow, USSR. There were a total number of 21 participating athletes, with the competition starting on 25 July 1980, and ending on 26 July 1980.

Medalists

Schedule

July 25, 1980

July 26, 1980

Results

See also
 1978 Men's European Championships Decathlon (Prague)
 1982 Men's European Championships Decathlon (Athens)
 1983 Men's World Championship Decathlon (Helsinki)
 1986 Men's European Championships Decathlon (Stuttgart)

References

External links
 Results

Decathlon
1980
Men's events at the 1980 Summer Olympics